Events in the year 1866 in Argentina.

Incumbents
 President: Bartolomé Mitre
 Vice President: Marcos Paz

Governors
 Buenos Aires Province: Mariano Saavedra (until 1 May), Adolfo Alsina (starting 1 May)
 Mendoza Province:
 until 1 November: Carlos González
 1 November-11 November: Melitón Arroyo
 starting 11 November: Carlos Juan Rodríguez
 Santa Fe Province: Nicasio Oroño

Vice Governors
Buenos Aires Province: vacant

Events
January 31 – Paraguayan War: The Battle of Pehuajó takes place when about 1500 Paraguayan troops, commanded by General Francisco Isidoro Resquín and Lieutenant Celestino Prieto, engage in a surprise attack Argentinian and Uruguayan battalions with around 2000 men, led by General Emilio Conesa; the Paraguayans are successful and the joint Argentine-Uruguayan force suffers heavy casualties.
May 24 – Paraguayan War: First Battle of Tuyutí is an allied victory.
July 18 – Battle of Boquerón (1866)
September 1–3 – Battle of Curuzú
September 22 – Battle of Curupayty

Deaths
February 15 – Juan Gregorio de las Heras, military leader (born 1780)

References

 
1860s in Argentina
History of Argentina (1852–1880)
Years of the 19th century in Argentina